The Menil Collection, located in Houston, Texas, refers either to a museum that houses the art collection of founders John de Menil and Dominique de Menil, or to the collection itself of approximately 17,000 paintings, sculptures, prints, drawings, photographs and rare books.

While the bulk of the collection is made up of a once-private collection, Menil Foundation, Inc. is a tax-exempt, nonprofit, public charity corporation formed under Section 501(c)3 of the Internal Revenue Code.  Additionally the Menil receives public funds granted by the City of Houston, the State of Texas, and the federal government through the National Endowment for the Arts.

The museum's holdings are diverse, including early to mid-twentieth century works of Yves Tanguy, René Magritte, Max Ernst, Man Ray, Marcel Duchamp, Henri Matisse, Jackson Pollock, and Pablo Picasso, among others. The museum also maintains an extensive collection of pop art and contemporary art from  Andy Warhol, Mark Rothko, Robert Rauschenberg, Vija Celmins and Cy Twombly, Jr., among others. Also included in the museum's permanent collection are antiquities and works of Byzantine, Medieval and tribal art.

History
The Renzo Piano-designed museum opened to the public in June 1987. It is governed by The Menil Foundation, Incorporated, a non-profit charitable corporation established in 1954 whose stated purpose was to promote understanding and culture, primarily through the arts. Initially, the Foundation also pursued land banking to stabilize the neighborhood surrounding the museum, and structured the administration and operations of the collection. With Dominique de Menil (a member of the Schlumberger family) serving as president, early board members included the Menils' son Francois, daughter Philippa Pellizzi, Malcolm McCorquodale, Edmund Snow Carpenter, Miles Rudolph Glaser, and Mickey Leland. Dominique de Menil ran the museum until her death in December 1997.

Campus and neighborhood
The museum campus has grown to include four satellite galleries to the main building: Cy Twombly Gallery (also designed by Piano); The Dan Flavin Installation at Richmond Hall, which houses Dominique de Menil's last commission (a series of three site-specific installations by Dan Flavin that were installed in 1998); The Byzantine Fresco Chapel; and the Menil Drawing Institute. Another building founded by the de Menils, but now operating as an independent foundation, is the Rothko Chapel.

The Menil Foundation began buying bungalow style homes in the area in the 1960s, painting each the same shade of gray to establish a commonality. When the museum building was constructed, it was painted what has become known as "Menil gray" to coordinate with the bungalows. Though subtle, the result is a neighborhood that feels aesthetically unified.

In 2013, the landscape architect Michael Van Valkenburgh was appointed to enhance and expand the Menil Collection’s 30-acre campus. The master site plan, by David Chipperfield Architects, calls for the creation of additional green space and walkways; a cafe; and new buildings for art.

Admission
The Menil Collection is open to the public, and admission is free. The Museum is open Wednesday through Sunday 11 am to 7 pm. It is located near the University of St. Thomas in the Neartown area of Houston.

Rothko Chapel

The Rothko Chapel, built in 1971, is an interfaith chapel commissioned by the de Menils. Each year, it hosts more than 60,000 visitors from as many as 85 countries around the world. The entrance-way contains holy books from various religious traditions that may be used in the chapel. The space is sky-lit, with kneeling mats, prayer benches, and meditation cushions. Fourteen canvases by Russian-born American painter Mark Rothko hang in the interior. The Rothko Chapel is an independent, non-profit organization. In 2001 the Chapel was listed in the National Register of Historic Places. It is also a featured entry in National Geographic's book Sacred Places of a Lifetime: 500 of the World's Most Peaceful and Powerful Destinations, published in 2009.

South of the entrance is a reflecting pool with the sculpture Broken Obelisk by Barnett Newman, installed in memory of murdered civil rights movement leader Martin Luther King Jr.

The Byzantine Fresco Chapel

Located in a separate building near the main collection, the Byzantine Fresco Chapel formerly housed two 13th century Byzantine church frescoes, an apse semi-dome of the Virgin Panagia and a dome featuring a depiction of Christ known as Christ Pantocrator. After having been removed from a church in Lysi in Turkish-occupied North Cyprus by the illegal art trade, they were recovered during the 1980s. According to the museum, they were the only such frescoes in the Americas. They were held at the museum by agreement with their owners, the Church of Cyprus.

In September 2011 the Menil Collection announced that the frescoes would be permanently returned to Cyprus in February 2012, an example of art repatriation. In January 2015, the Menil disclosed its plans to reuse the former consecrated chapel space as a site for long-term contemporary installation work. The first exhibition in the reopened space is "The Infinity Machine", a new work commissioned by the Menil by Janet Cardiff and George Bures Miller.

Cy Twombly Pavilion
In 1992, Renzo Piano was commissioned by Dominique de Menil to build a small, independent pavilion dedicated to the work of Cy Twombly, Jr. in the grounds of the Menil Collection. In contrast to the Menil’s main museum building and the surrounding bungalows, the Cy Twombly Gallery is built of sand-colored block concrete, is square in plan and contains nine galleries. Similar to the main museum, it is lit through the roof, but here with an external canopy of louvers, shading the sloping, hipped glass roof, below which a fabric ceiling diffuses the light, giving a reduced intensity of around 300 lux.

Menil Drawing Institute
The Menil Drawing Institute, opened in 2018, is the first ground-up building in the United States dedicated to the exhibit, study, storage and conservation of modern and contemporary artworks on paper, according to the Menil Collection. Los Angeles-based architecture firm Johnston Marklee and New York-based landscape architecture firm Michael Van Valkenburgh Associates designed the Drawing Institute. They worked in close collaboration with the New York–based structural engineering firm Guy Nordenson and Associates. Johnston Marklee was selected to design it after winning a competition that also included David Chipperfield, SANAA and Tatiana Bilbao. Rhode Island-based Gilbane Building Company, a subsidiary of Gilbane, Inc., was selected as the general contractor.

Vandalism
On June 13, 2012, a 22-year-old museum visitor named Uriel Landeros defaced an original Picasso at the museum, Woman in a Red Armchair, using black spray paint to stencil a bull and a matador and the word Conquista on the work of art. The vandal, a self-proclaimed artist, said that he did it to make a statement, and did not intend to destroy the painting however Landeros was sentenced to two years in prison for felony graffiti and criminal mischief.

Management

Menil Foundation
The museum continues to be governed by the Menil Foundation. The foundation has been solely responsible for acquisition funds, which during the first years averaged more than $1 million annually, and operating disbursements of between $2.7 million and $2.9 million a year. Nearly half of the money for the museum building was derived from outside sources in Houston, in particular the Cullen Foundation and the Brown Foundation, which contributed $5 million each. By 2001, the Menil Foundation's endowment is $200 million. The budget pays for the museum's operation and for exhibitions, research and catalogs.

Brown & Root heir Louisa Stude Sarofim has been president of the Menil Collection and Foundation since 1998, following the death of Dominique de Menil. She has since become the museum's largest donor. The Board of Trustees includes, among others, Suzanne Deal Booth.

Directors
The museum's first director was Walter Hopps. Before joining the Menil Collection as director in 1983, he had worked with Mrs. de Menil on planning the museum and its program. Between 1999 and 2003, Ned Rifkin served as the museum's director; during his time in office, there were frequent clashes over the museum' direction and whether Rifkin was departing from the vision of its founder. Josef Helfenstein was named director in 2004. Until his departure in 2015, the Menil doubled its annual attendance, increased its endowment by almost 54 percent, and added more than 1,000 works to the collection, including pieces by Jasper Johns, Claes Oldenburg, Robert Rauschenberg, Richard Serra and Kara Walker.

Curators 
Michelle White took up her post at the Menil after honing her skills at Harvard's Fogg Art Museum and the Museum of Fine Arts, Houston; her endeavors have been as varied as projects with the Houston collective Otabenga Jones & Associates (who aim to “teach the truth to the black youth") and the Richard Serra drawings retrospective that traveled to the San Francisco Museum of Modern Art and New York's Metropolitan Museum of Art. Among others, Flash Art and Modern Painters have published her writings.

See also
 Charmstone (sculpture)
 Isolated Mass/Circumflex (Number 2) (1968–1978)

References

External links

Byzantine Fresco Chapel official site

Cy Twombly Gallery

1987 establishments in Texas
Art museums established in 1987
Art museums and galleries in Texas
Biographical museums in Texas
Modern art museums in the United States
Modernist architecture in Texas
Museums in Houston
Renzo Piano buildings
Former private collections in the United States
Neartown, Houston
African art museums in the United States